Piz Grialetsch is a mountain of the Albula Alps, Switzerland, overlooking the Fuorcla da Grialetsch in the canton of Graubünden. It lies on the range between the Dischma and Engadin valleys, which culminates at Piz Vadret.

References

External links
 Piz Grialetsch on Hikr

Mountains of the Alps
Mountains of Graubünden
Mountains of Switzerland
Davos
S-chanf
Zernez